Guido Kerkhoff (born November 22, 1967, in Schüttorf) is a German business executive. From 2011 to 2018 Kerkhoff was Chief financial officer of ThyssenKrupp. From July 2018 to the end of September 2019, Kerkhoff was Chairman of the executive board (CEO) of Thyssenkrupp. He has been Deputy Chairman of the management board of Klöckner & Co since 2019 and is expected to become chairman in 2021.

Education 
Kerkhoff studied Business administration at Bielefeld University and the Saarland University.

Career 
Kerkhoff started his career in 1995 in the area of group accounting at the German energy provider Vereinigte Elektrizitätswerke Westfalen (VEW). From 1996 he held a leading management position at Bertelsmann in the controlling department. After six years at Bertelsmann, Kerkhoff moved 2002 to Deutsche Telekom where he became the right-hand man of CFO Karl-Gerhard Eick. In 2009, Kerkhoff was responsible for the eastern European business. 2011 he became CFO at ThyssenKrupp. At that time, a number of investments were made in Brazil and the US, which ultimately cost the company several billions. Following the resignation of Heinrich Hiesinger as CEO, Kerkhoff was appointed chairman of the executive board and CEO of Thyssenkrupp on July 13, 2018. He was retired from this position on September 25, 2019.

Private life 
Kerkhoff is married, has two children and lives in Essen (Germany).

References 

1967 births
German chief executives
People from Bentheim
Bielefeld University alumni
Saarland University alumni
Living people
Chief financial officers